Highland Park High School (often shortened HPHS or HP) is a public, co-educational high school immediately north of downtown Dallas in University Park, Texas. It is a part of the Highland Park Independent School District, which serves approximately 32,200 residents who are predominantly college-educated professionals and business leaders. It serves all of University Park, most of the town of Highland Park, and portions of Dallas.

As of the 2021–22 school year, the school had an enrollment of 2,260 students and 144.6 classroom teachers (on an FTE basis), for a student–teacher ratio of 15.6:1. There were 4 students (0.2% of enrollment) eligible for free lunch and none eligible for reduced-cost lunch. Its CEEB code is 441740. The campus code for TEA reporting purposes is 057911001 (based on the HPISD code of 057911).

History

A yellow brick schoolhouse, the Armstrong School, opened on October 12, 1915. It served children only through ninth grade. In 1922, the school moved to Normandy Avenue after HPISD purchased 11 lots in 1920. Tenth grade was added in 1922, and 11th grade in 1923. In 1924, 34 students became the first graduating class of the Highland Park Independent School District when they participated in HPISD's first high school graduation ceremony on June 2, 1924 (at that time, only 11 years of school were required before college; 12th grade was added in 1937). The school's yearbook for that year, the 1924 Highlander, had a paragraph reading:Many schools live merely on the momentum and traditions they have gathered in the more flourishing days of past. We are proud of our short past, but we are prouder of the Highland Park High School that is to be.This first location (at the corner of Normandy Avenue and High School Avenue) later became the district's middle school in 1937 when the current Highland Park High School building was erected on Emerson Avenue. The old building became Highland Park Junior High School, which in later years was renamed Arch H. McCulloch Middle School. The school added the fifth grade and split into Highland Park Middle School for grades 7 and 8 and Arch H. McCulloch Intermediate School for grades 5 and 6 upon moving to a new facility; the old building was demolished. The street adjacent to the current middle school is named High School Avenue to this day.

Eugene Lawler was the first principal. The complete list of principals through the present day is as follows:

Wiseman, Sr. was principal for 34 years, retiring in 1962. He was a decorated Captain in the United States Army and served in combat during World War II. Wiseman was featured in Look Magazine'''s May 1960 edition. He is credited for developing the first language laboratory in a U.S. public school. Convinced that students learned quickly by ear, he solicited funds from several prominent Highland Park businessmen to provide the reel-to-reel tape recorders needed to record and replay the daily lesson plan. He then created a language lab. Wiseman had the first remedial reading classes in a U.S. public school for the condition known today as dyslexia. He tutored his own grandson.

In 1987, the HPISD school board voted to not to petition the University Interscholastic League (UIL) to keep Highland Park High School in athletic class 5A; the UIL had the power to demote Highland Park High School to athletic class 4A as part of its biannual reclassification. Since then, a joke told around the UIL's biannual reclassification is that the cutoff for Class 4A is "Highland Park plus two", though in practice the school's enrollment has been well below the normal cutoff. In the 2014 reclassifications, the school moved up to 6A (a new classification the UIL added as part of a larger reclassification). In the 2016 reclassifications, the school moved down to 5A. The average class size is 30 students per teacher, with about 550 students per grade.

In 2003, a four-year remodeling of the school was completed that added a new wing to provide more classroom space and allow for a new, larger cafeteria. In 2015, a $361.4 million bond package passed HPISD board approval and citizens' vote that allowed for new parking spaces and renovations to the attached tennis center and natatorium—eventually eliminating the natatorium and replacing it with classrooms.

Highland Park High School is the only high school in the Highland Park Independent School District. Other schools in the district include University Park Elementary, Robert S. Hyer Elementary, John S. Armstrong Elementary, John S. Bradfield Elementary, and Michael M. Boone Elementary. These five schools feed into Arch H. McCulloch Intermediate School and Highland Park Middle School, both of which are in the same building.

 Recent events 
In 1999, Dallas police issued 200 alcohol and curfew violations citations to Park Cities teens partying in a Deep Ellum warehouse. CNN picked up the story, and after it emerged that parents had rented the facility and contracted a bus company to safely deliver students to and from the party, the Alliance on Underage Drinking (ALOUD) started the "Parents Who Host, Lose the Most" campaign, which informs parents about health, safety and legal ramifications of serving alcohol to underage people.

In 2004, Simon & Schuster published Francine Pascal's The Ruling Class, a teen drama set at Highland Park High School. The school's newspaper, The Bagpipe, published community reactions to the book.

In 2005, The Dallas Morning News published a story about the Friday of Highland Park's homecoming spirit week, on which several seniors dressed as thugs, Mexicans, maids and other caricatures of racial minorities. Some pointed to this as support for the general perception of HPHS and the Park Cities as a "bubble" (as the area is known in the Dallas-Fort Worth Metroplex). The article ignited a storm of letter-writing and editorializing to and in the Morning News. Soon after it was published, two swastikas were spray-painted on a sign in front of the school.

In 2005 and 2006, Highland Park students received a multitude of state and national awards and set several new records in Texas. The UIL Science Team, under the leadership of AP Chemistry teacher Wenzen Chuang, won state for the second time in school history. In 2005, The Bagpipe received the Gold Crown Award for excellence in journalism. Later that year, HPHS was one of 15 high schools in the country to win an NSPA Pacemaker. Also in 2005, the school's yearbook, The Highlander, was chosen as a finalist for the NSPA Pacemaker award and Highland Park Television was chosen as a finalist for the NSPA Broadcast Pacemaker; Highland Park Television won the award the following year. The Bagpipe received a second Gold Crown Award in 2011, for the previous year's newspaper. The Highlander has won many awards in recent years, including a Gold Crown Award in 2018 and a Pacemaker award in 2019. 

In the winter of 2012 and spring of 2013, numerous bomb threats were found across the campus. Students and faculty were released early three times, and eventually the FBI was called in. An arrest was made in April 2013. 

In 2013, the stage of the high school's auditorium (Palmer Auditorium) was honorarily named after Linda Raya, a longtime drama teacher at the school. Raya's 40+-year career at Highland Park saw countless theatrical productions, which now continue on the newly named Linda Raya Stage.

In 2014, HPISD, HPHS, and Superintendent Dawson Orr received national attention for the controversial banning of seven books previously used in high school English studies, after a group of parents protested the books' contents. The books were The Art of Racing in the Rain, by Garth Stein; The Working Poor: Invisible in America, by David K. Shipler; Siddhartha, by Hermann Hesse; The Absolutely True Diary of a Part-Time Indian, by Sherman Alexie; An Abundance of Katherines, by John Green; The Glass Castle, by Jeannette Walls; and Song of Solomon, by Toni Morrison.

On September 29, 2014, Orr reversed his decision to ban the books, writing in an email to parents, "I made the decision in an attempt to de-escalate the conflict, and I readily admit that it had the opposite effect. I take full responsibility for the decision, and I apologize for the disruption it has caused."

In 2015, Orr retired and was replaced by Tom Trigg, who had previously served as the superintendent of Blue Valley Unified School District in Overland Park, Kansas. Trigg's salary upon hiring was notable for its size, coming in at a base of $325,000 (compared to Dallas ISD's superintendent salary of $306,000).

 Athletics 
In 2005, Sports Illustrated listed HPHS as Texas's best sports program (and 16th in the U.S.).

Baseball

The baseball team's games are held at Scotland Yard (Highland Park), immediately north of the high school campus.

Swimming and diving
The Highland Park girls' swimming and diving team holds the UIL record with ten consecutive state titles.

Tennis
As of the end of the 2020 season, the school's tennis team has won 21 state titles, making it the school's most successful sport. From the start of the 2008 season until November 2015, the team kept an unbroken winning streak of 174 matches. It was broken on November 11, 2015, when HPHS lost to New Braunfels in the 6A semifinals, marking the first time since 1999 that HPHS did not compete in the state championship. From 2008 through 2014, the team won eight consecutive state titles. The team returned to win the 2016, 2017, 2018, 2019, 2020 state titles.

Football

 20th century 

In 1920s, Bryan Street High School players called the HPHS football team the "silk stocking boys." Games between the two schools caused so many riots among the spectators that they were banned from playing each other. H. B. Howard was the football coach at the time. Shirley Hodges, a Dallas pediatrician, served on the HPISD school board and was the team's first doctor.Coached by Rusty Russell (1942–45) and led by Doak Walker and Bobby Layne, the Scots made it to the championship game in 1944 and 1945. After losing 20-7 to Port Arthur in 1944, Highland Park tied Waco 7-7 in the 1945 state championship in front of a record 45,790-person crowd at the Cotton Bowl, becoming co-champion. In 1947, HPHS lost the state final 22-13 to San Antonio Brackenridge. In 1957, HPHS defeated Port Arthur 21-9 under the guidance of Thurman Jones.

 21st century 
The HPHS football team is now coached by Randy Allen, who holds a 361-86-6 record as of 2016, making him Texas's second-winningest active high school football coach and its fourth-winningest of all time. Allen received the 2013 Grant Teaff Fellowship of Christian Athletes Lifetime Achievement Award, joining such coaching greats as Tony Dungy and Bobby Bowden. As of the end of the 2018 season, Allen has led the Scots to four state titles, in 2005, 2016, 2017,and 2018.

In 2005, Matthew Stafford led Highland Park to an undefeated season for the 4A Division I state championship. The 2005 season was HPHS's only undefeated, untied season ever. The team beat Marshall 59-0, the largest margin of victory ever in a UIL 11-man state championship football game.

In 2007, the Scots went undefeated into the state final against Austin Lake Travis, but lost 36-34. , Highland Park Scots football teams had made a state-record 49 playoff appearances.

In 2016, the Scots won the Division I 5A state final against Temple, Texas, 16-7.

In 2017, the Scots won the Division I 5A state final against Manvel, Texas, 53-49 on December 22 in front of 24,975 people at AT&T Stadium. The Scots overcame a 10-point deficit in the game's last three minutes and won just as Manvel was one yard from scoring again. This marked the school's first ever back-to-back state championships. The 2017 season broke the school record for the most points scored in a single season, with 732 points in 16 games. As of 2017, they have had eight state finals appearances (and won five of them).

In 2018, Highland Park won its third straight state championship in a game against Shadow Creek and completed a perfect 16-0 record.

In 2019, the Scots were the Division I 5A divisional champions.

Cross country
The Highland Park girls' cross country team has set numerous records throughout the years, having sent a runner to the state meet every year since the program was created. The team has won more state championships than any other cross country team in Texas.

 Lacrosse 
As of the close of the 2017 season, the Highland Park boys' lacrosse team has won seven Division I and four Division II Texas High School Lacrosse League (THSLL) state championships. This includes two years (2012 and 2015) when the DI and DII teams won their titles simultaneously. DII titles are notable because many Texas high schools do not compete at the DI level, making DII titles the highest achievement for many schools. The team has included 23 US Lacrosse All-Americans since 2004.

The DI team was coached by Derek Thomson through the 2017 season. Thomson led the team to all 7 DI titles and won the THSLL Coach of the Year award twice. Upon his retirement, he received the Earl Bill Award from the THSLL commissioner. As of 2018, HPHS has fostered the development of 28 players who went on to play Division I NCAA lacrosse.

Of the seven DI state titles, three were victories over St. Mark's School of Texas (2009, 2010, and 2012) and two were over the Episcopal School of Dallas (ESD) (2005 and 2008). St. Mark's and ESD are both in Dallas near Highland Park. Other rivals include Jesuit College Preparatory School of Dallas (another Dallas-based team), which beat HPHS in the 2016 and 2017 DI title games.

Unique among Highland Park High School's sports, the lacrosse team is not school-run because lacrosse is not a UIL-sanctioned sport. It runs as a private organization.

 Belles 

The drill team at Highland Park High School is called the Highland Park Belles. It performs dance routines at halftime during football games, and at pep rallies and other events. The Belles were founded in 1983–84 with Cathy Wheat as director. Wheat is a member of the National Drill Team Directors Hall of Fame. She was director of the Irving High School Toy Tigers for 10 years before founding the Belles, which she directed for 23 years. Angie Harmon, a Highland Park graduate, credits Wheat with inspiring her to have confidence as an actress. The Belles hold an annual fundraiser, the Spaghetti Supper. They sell tickets to HPHS students and staff and the Highland Park community. All the money raised goes to fund the team's needs.

 Field hockey 
While it is not an official school sport, HPHS has a field hockey team. Founded in 2009, it is considered a club team. Tryouts are held every spring for both the junior varsity and varsity teams. The field hockey season runs from August to November. The team plays against other teams in the Dallas-Fort Worth Metroplex. 

State titles
Baseball
1998(4A)
Girls Cross Country
1981(5A), 1982(5A), 1988(4A), 1989(4A), 1992(4A), 1997(4A), 1998(4A), 1999(4A), 2001(4A), 2002(4A), 2004(4A), 2010(4A), 2011(4A), 2012(4A)
Football
1945(All), 1957(ALL), 2005(4A), 2016 (5A DI), 2017 (5A DI), 2018 (5A D1)
Boys Golf
1950(2A), 1951(2A), 1977(4A), 1989(4A), 1990(4A), 1991(4A), 1992(4A), 1993(4A), 2001(4A), 2002(4A), 2003(4A), 2005(4A), 2006(4A), 2008(4A), 2010(4A), 2013(4A), 2019(5A)
Girls Golf
1998(4A), 1999(4A), 2000(4A), 2008(4A)
Boys Lacrosse
Division I: 2004, 2005, 2008, 2009, 2010, 2012, 2015
Division II: 2008, 2012, 2015, 2018
Girls Soccer
1994 (All), 1996 (All), 2000 (4A), 2002 (4A), 2012(4A), 2016 (5A)
Boys Swimming
2000(4A), 2017(5A), 2018 (5A)
Girls Swimming
2001(4A), 2002(4A), 2003(4A), 2004(4A), 2005(4A), 2006(4A), 2007(4A), 2008(4A), 2009(4A), 2010(4A)
Team Tennis (22)
1982–83 (5A), 1989–90 (4A), 1990–91 (4A), 1991–92 (4A), 1997–98 (4A), 2001–02 (4A), 2003–04 (4A), 2004–05 (4A), 2005–06 (4A), 2006–07 (4A), 2008–09 (4A), 2009–10 (4A), 2010–11 (4A), 2011–12 (4A), 2012–13 (4A), 2013–14 (4A), 2014–15 (6A), 2016–17 (5A), 2018–19 (5A), 2019-2020 (5A), 2020-2021 (5A, 2021-2022 (5A)
Boys Track
1940(All)
Boys Wrestling
1999(All), 2000(All), 2003(All), 2005(All), 2006(All)

Highland Park holds the UIL record for most athletic state titles by one school: 77 (in all classes).

 Academics 

 Standardized testing 

 National Merit Scholarship program 
HPHS students take the PSAT in grades 10 and 11 and thus qualify for National Merit Scholarship Program awards. The following table summarizes recent years' awards:

SAT/ACT 
About 99% of HPHS students take the SAT or ACT. The average SAT score in 2015–16 was 1833 (out of 2400) compared to a national average score of 1243. The average ACT score in 2015–16 was a 27.6 (out of 36) compared to a national average score of 20.6.

Advanced Placement (AP) and International Baccalaureate (IB) 
Most HPHS students take AP courses; HPHS does not offer IB courses. HPHS offers open enrollment for more than 20 AP courses. The school requires all students enrolled in AP courses to take the corresponding AP exam. 78.6% of HPHS students took an AP class and the ensuing exam in May 2015 compared to the state average of 24.9%. In May 2017, 1,093 Highland Park students took a combined 2,900 AP exams. In May 2015, 78.9% of exams taken were passed, meaning the student received a score of 3 or higher. That compares to a state passing rate of 49.1% in May 2015 and a national passing rate of 67% in May 2017.

 College 
HPHS has a graduation rate consistently above 98%, compared to the state average of 89.0% in 2015. The six-year longitudinal graduation rate was 99.8% compared to the state average of 90.9%. 86.0% of HPHS graduates in 2015 were rated college-ready in both English language arts and mathematics by the TEA compared to a state average of 35.0%. Scholarships offered to the graduating class of 2016 exceeded a comparable monetary value of $14,500,000—almost $30,000 per senior. After graduation, 94% of the class of 2016 matriculated to a four-year college, including Harvard, Stanford, West Point, and Air Force. Other HPHS graduates have attended Princeton, Yale, and Dartmouth.

 Extracurriculars 

 Band 

The Highlander Band's performance includes making its first-ever UIL State Marching Band finals appearance in 2017 where the band made the top ten. Their success continued into 2019 when they earned 2nd place in the UIL State Marching Band finals, marking the highest state placement of the band in its history.

 Awards 
In the September 1981 issue of Money Magazine, Highland Park was ranked as one of the top twelve public high schools in the United States, and in January 1984 Parade Magazine listed Highland Park as among the top fifteen schools in the United States. In 2008, Highland Park was ranked 15th in Newsweek Magazine's list of the top public high schools in the United States, based on the Challenge Index by Jay Mathews. Highland Park High School has been named a National Blue Ribbon School on two occasions, in 1984-85 and again in 2007. In 2012, Highland Park was ranked 8th out of the top 10 high schools in North Texas by Children at Risk, a research and advocacy institute dedicated to helping children. In 2016, Highland Park was named one of "America's Best High Schools" by Newsweek Magazine and earned a spot on U.S. News & World Report's Gold Medal list of top high schools. In 2019, U.S. News & World Report ranked Highland Park the 210th best high school in the U.S. and 35th in Texas.

 Literary festival 
In 1995, the first Highland Park Literary Festival began as a collaboration between interested parents and the English Department.  The event has become an annual festival where HPHS students have enjoyed meeting, working with, and learning from distinguished writers, including George Plimpton, Doug Wright, Michael Chabon, Marion Winik, Scott Simon, Tim O'Brien, Russell Banks, Anchee Min, Billy Collins, Tobias Wolff, and Jamie Ford.

 Affluence 
The Park Cities (Highland Park and University Park) are often referred to as "The Bubble."

The Texas Education Agency campus profiles state that the funds spent per student at Highland Park are similar in amount to those spent per student at Woodrow Wilson High School.

The average teacher's salary at HPHS is $60,770 compared to the state average of $51,891.

Student body
According to The Dallas Morning News, in 2005 the high school's ethnic makeup was about 99% white. By 2014, that number dropped to 90.3% of the graduating class being white. In 2015, 89.1% of the graduating class was white. In the 2015–16 school year, 88.4% of the Highland Park High School student body was white.

In the 2010–11 school year HPHS had no low income students. By the 2015–16 school year, that number remained at 0.0% economically disadvantaged students for the entire District. In 2010–11, 7.9% of the students were considered "at risk," but in 2015–16 that rose to 11.4%. About 80% of students partake in extracurricular activities, and over 50% partake in athletic teams.

By 2011 a The Dallas Morning News report stated that 93% of HPHS students were "college-ready" (ready to attend post-secondary educational institutions).

Although students are only required to complete 50 hours of community service to graduate, the graduating class of 2017 averaged 150 hours per senior.

 Notable alumni 

Arts/sciences/academics
Pierce Brown, Class of 2006, science fiction author
Donald D. Clayton, Class of 1953, prize-winning astrophysicist, SMU Distinguished Alumnus, American Academy of Arts and Sciences Fellow
Jackson Lee Morgan,Class of  2011 Grammy nominee
James Cronin, 1980 Nobel Prize-winning physicist
Carol Hall, 1954, composer and lyricist
Angie Harmon, 1991, actress, star of TV series Rizzoli & Isles, Law & OrderRobert H. Jackson, 1952, Pulitzer Prize-winning photographer of Lee Harvey Oswald's assassination
Wendy Kopp, 1985, founder of Teach for America
Dorothy Malone, actress, 1956 Academy Award for Best Supporting Actress
Jayne Mansfield, actress, star of films including Will Success Spoil Rock Hunter?, Promises! Promises!L. Lowry Mays, 1954, Chairman of the Joint Board, National Association of Broadcasters, Chairman, Board of Regents, Texas A&M University
Stephanie March, 1993, actress, star of TV series Law & Order: Special Victims Unit''
Holland Roden, Class of 2006, actress, star of TV series Teen Wolf
Megan Mylan, 2008 Academy Award-winning documentarian
Willis Alan Ramsey, Class of 1969, singer/songwriter
Phillip Sandifer, 1977 singer/songwriter
Stark Sands, Class of 1997, film, stage and television actor
Elliot See, Class of 1945, Project Gemini astronaut, killed in the 1966 NASA T-38 crash
Doug Wright, Pulitzer Prize- and Tony Award-winning playwright
Robert M. Young, Darwin scholar and Kleinian psychotherapist

Athletics
Fred Benners, quarterback for NFL's New York Giants
David Browning, 1952 Olympic gold medalist in 3-meter springboard diving
Harrison Frazar, professional golfer
Mike Heath, swimmer, three gold medals and one silver at 1984 Olympics
Shaun Jordan, two-time Olympic gold medalist with 400-meter free-relay teams at 1988 Olympics and 1992 Olympics
Clayton Kershaw, World Series Champion (2020) pitcher for Los Angeles Dodgers, 3-time Cy Young Award winner (2011, '13, '14), National League MVP (2014)
Hank Kuehne, PGA Tour golfer and 1998 U.S. Amateur champion
Kelli Kuehne, LPGA golfer and two-time U.S. Women's Amateur champion
Trip Kuehne, 2007 U.S. Mid-Amateur Golf champion and 3-time NCAA golf All-American
Bobby Layne, quarterback, 3-time NFL champion, Pro Football Hall of Fame inductee
Lance McIlhenny,  winningest quarterback in Southern Methodist University and Southwest Conference history
Richard Quick, Auburn University swim coach and 5-time U.S. Olympic coach
Dave Richards, NFL offensive lineman
John Roach, quarterback, defensive back and punter for NFL's Green Bay Packers, Dallas Cowboys
Nick Rose, American football placekicker
Kyle Rote Jr., NASL soccer star, son of Kyle Rote
Scottie Scheffler, PGA golfer, 2022 Masters champion
Anthony Schlegel, former linebacker for NFL's New York Jets, Cincinnati Bengals
Bo Schultz, baseball pitcher
Daniel Sepulveda, two-time Ray Guy Award winner, punter for Pittsburgh Steelers
Matthew Stafford,  former quarterback for Georgia Bulldogs, starting quarterback for Los Angeles Rams, NFL Super Bowl Champion (2022)
Doak Walker, 1948 Heisman Trophy winner, College and Pro Football Hall of Fame inductee
Kyle Williams, offensive tackle for Seattle Seahawks
Chris Young, MLB pitcher for 2015 World Series champion Kansas City Royals

Government
James A Baker, justice of the Texas Supreme Court
Chris Bell, U.S. representative
Bill Clements, governor of Texas
Starke Taylor, mayor of Dallas, cotton investor
Brandon Williams, U.S. representative

Other
John Hinckley, Jr., attempted assassin of President Ronald Reagan
Levi Pettit, University of Oklahoma student involved in racist chants
Trevor Rees-Jones, founder and chairman of Chief Oil and Gas
George Seay, businessman, co-founder and CEO of Annandale Capital, philanthropist, and conservative political activist

References

External links

 

Educational institutions established in 1922
Public high schools in Dallas County, Texas
1922 establishments in Texas